Goderdzi Machaidze (born 17 July 1992) is a Georgian footballer who plays as a defender for FC Torpedo Kutaisi.

References

External links
 

1992 births
Living people
Footballers from Georgia (country)
FC Merani Tbilisi players
FC Guria Lanchkhuti players
FC Sasco players
FC Gagra players
FC Zugdidi players
FC Dila Gori players
FC Vereya players
FC Torpedo Kutaisi players
Erovnuli Liga players
First Professional Football League (Bulgaria) players
Expatriate footballers from Georgia (country)
Expatriate footballers in Bulgaria
Association football defenders
Footballers from Tbilisi